Young Hollywood is a privately held multimedia entertainment company founded in Los Angeles, California, by R. J. Williams. 
The company licenses the “Young Hollywood” trademark domestically and internationally for a range of consumer products and services. In addition, they own a television network and are one of the world's largest producers and distributors of celebrity content in the digital space. Their content has received over 2 billion views.

Television Network

Young Hollywood is available in over 700 million homes and in 24 languages.  YHN is a 24/7 over-the-top premium network that includes scheduled programming and a significant video-on-demand library, that is currently available in more than 180 countries. The network creates and delivers original content 52 weeks a year to a global audience.

Young Hollywood originally teamed up exclusively with Apple in the beginning of 2015 to launch the network with exclusive content that could only be found on  their Apple TV platform. The channel premiered seven new original half-hour series and programming across multiple platforms including reality, scripted series, animation, and documentaries with a focus on topics such as entertainment, music, sports, fashion, and lifestyle. At the end of  2015, the network expanded to include devices such as Roku, Amazon Fire TV, Samsung Blu-ray players, and Android tablets and phones.

Programming
Young Hollywood content is known for not touching gossip and being anti-paparazzi. Their website, YoungHollywood.com, officially launched in 2007 and reached 3 million unique visitors per month. YH grew their audience further by creating a street team of fan ambassadors that promote Young Hollywood to their friends and fans   Their distribution network extended the reach upwards of 100 million viewers.

Young Hollywood has been compared to MTV, in that they both offer a full 360 degree approach to reach millennials.  They both create original content, have a built in distribution network with a significant marketing arm to get eyeballs on their content, and have direct relationships with advertisers.

Partnerships

YouTube 
Young Hollywood teamed up with Google for their channel initiative to launch "The Young Hollywood Network" (YHN) in January 2012 on YouTube.  Other brands included in the initiative included WWE and The Wall Street Journal  The Young Hollywood channel on YouTube is ranked #12 on the "Top YouTube Original Channels of All-Time" list that is compiled by AdAge magazine.

TikTok 
Young Hollywood created the first live streamed hit show on TikTok's live.ly platform which has a user base of over 95 million.  The premiere episode of Young Hollywood's series had nearly 600,000 live viewers. Other notable Live.ly users include Mark Cuban and Time inc.

Jimmy Kimmel Live  
Young Hollywood programming was the subject of a skit during a 2012 episode of Jimmy Kimmel Live

Four Seasons Hotel 
In April 2010, Young Hollywood formed a strategic partnership with the Four Seasons Hotel Los Angeles at Beverly Hills to build a fiber-optic enabled, high-definition broadcast studio within the hotel property, from where it conducts scheduled celebrity interviews on a daily basis.  In August 2011, the partnership was expanded  to include the restaurant of the Four Seasons Hotel, with the launch of The Young Hollywood Salad.

International Expansion

Young Hollywood formed an exclusive international content distribution deal with Fremantle Media. The first two series under the agreement have sold  to over 30 International territories    
. YH content can be found on RTL Group in Germany, Middle East Broadcasting Center in the Middle East, M-Net in South Africa and the Lifestyle Network in the Philippines.

References

External links
 

American entertainment websites
Internet properties established in 2007
Entertainment news shows in the United States
Online mass media companies of the United States
Infotainment